Svenstrup may refer to:

 Svenstrup, Aalborg Municipality, a town in Denmark
 Svenstrup station, a railway station serving the town
 Svenstrup (manor house), a manor house in Køge Municipality
 Svenstrup & Vendelboe, a Danish electro/dance/house producer team